Alfred Tennyson "Budge" Garrett (April 17, 1893 – June 11, 1950) was a professional American football player with the Akron Pros of the American Professional Football Association (renamed the National Football League in 1922). During his one year with the Pros he won the first AFPA/NFL Championship. He returned to the NFL in 1922 as a player-coach for the Milwaukee Badgers, compiling a 2–1–3 record.

Prior to joining the NFL, Garrett grew up in Oklahoma on a Creek Indian Reservation. He later attended a played college football at Rutgers University. He later made the 1915 College Football All-America Team. He first played professional football for the Massillon Tigers and Youngstown Patricians of the "Ohio League", during the pre-NFL era.

References

1893 births
1950 deaths
American football guards
Akron Pros players
Massillon Tigers players
Milwaukee Badgers coaches
Milwaukee Badgers players
Rutgers Scarlet Knights football players
Youngstown Patricians players
Players of American football from Oklahoma